Shenango Creek is a  long 2nd order tributary to Conneauttee Creek in Erie County, Pennsylvania.

Course
Shenango Creek rises about 1.5 miles northeast of Powers Corners, Pennsylvania, and then flows north then curves southeast to join Conneauttee creek about 1.5 miles north of Edinboro.

Watershed
Shenango Creek drains  of area, receives about 45.1 in/year of precipitation, has a wetness index of 481.03, and is about 38% forested.

See also
 List of rivers of Pennsylvania

References

Rivers of Pennsylvania
Rivers of Erie County, Pennsylvania